This is the complete list of Commonwealth Games medallists in shooting from 1966 to 2014.

Men's pistol

10 metre air pistol

10 metre air pistol pairs

50 metre free pistol

50 metre free pistol pairs

25 metre centre fire pistol

25 metre centre fire pistol pairs

25 metre rapid fire pistol

25 metre rapid fire pistol pairs

25 metre standard pistol

25 metre standard pistol pairs

Men's rifle

10 metre air rifle

10 metre air rifle pairs

10 metre running target

10 metre running target pairs

50 metre small bore rifle prone

50 metre small bore rifle prone pairs

50 metre small bore rifle three positions

50 metre small bore rifle three positions pairs

Men's shotgun

Clay pigeon trap

Clay pigeon trap pairs

Skeet

Skeet pairs

Trap

Trap pairs

Double trap

Double trap pairs

Mixed events

Full bore Queen's prize individual

Full bore Queen's prize pairs

Women's pistol

25 metre sport pistol

25 metre sport pistol pairs

10 metre air pistol

10 metre air pistol pairs

Women's rifle

50 metre small bore rifle prone

50 metre small bore rifle prone pairs

50 metre small bore rifle three positions

50 metre small bore rifle three positions pairs

10 metre air rifle

10 metre air rifle pairs

Women's shotgun

Trap

Trap pairs

Clay pigeon trap

Clay pigeon trap pairs

Double trap

Double trap pairs

Skeet

Skeet pairs

References
Results Database from the Commonwealth Games Federation

Shooting
Medalists

Commonw